The 2009 World Professional Billiards Championship, the top international professional competition in English billiards, was held between 2 and 6 September 2009 at the Northern Snooker Centre in Leeds, England. The 17 players were divided into three groups of four, and one group of five, with the top two in each group advancing into the knock-out round.

Pankaj Advani won his first World Professional Billiards Championship title after beating defending champion Mike Russell in the final 2030–1253.

Group round

Group A

Group B

Group C

Group D

Knock-out round

References

External links

2009
World Professional Billiards Championship
World Professional Billiards Championship
September 2009 sports events in the United Kingdom
Sports competitions in Leeds
Cue sports in the United Kingdom